The Republicans (LR) is a liberal-conservative political party in France, largely inspired by the Gaullist tradition. It holds pro-European views. The party was formed on 30 May 2015 as the re-incorporation of the Union for a Popular Movement (UMP), which had been established in 2002 under the leadership of then President of France Jacques Chirac.

LR, as previously the UMP, used to be one of the two major political parties in the French Fifth Republic along with the centre-left Socialist Party. It is the largest party in the Senate since 2014. Its candidate in the 2017 presidential election, former Prime Minister François Fillon, placed third in the first round, with 20% of the vote. Following the 2017 legislative election, LR became the second-largest party in the National Assembly, behind President Emmanuel Macron's La République En Marche! party. After disappointing results in the 2019 European Parliament election, party leader Laurent Wauquiez resigned. He was replaced by Christian Jacob, who remained in office until after the 2022 legislative election, which saw LR lose half its seats although it became the kingmaker in a hung parliament. In the 2022 presidential election, LR nominee Valérie Pécresse placed fifth with 4.7% of the first-round vote, which was deemed disappointing. Eric Ciotti became President of LR after the 2022 leadership election.

LR is a member of the European People's Party (EPP), the Centrist Democrat International (CDI) and the International Democrat Union (IDU).

History

Origins in the UMP 
The UMP's (Union for a Popular Movement) change of party name and of party structure was one of the promises made by Nicolas Sarkozy during his campaign for the UMP Presidency in 2014. After his election in November 2014, Nicolas Sarkozy, the President of France from 2007 to 2012, put forward the request to the party's general committee to change its name to Les Républicains ("The Republicans") and alter the statutes of the party. The proposed statutes provided for, among other provisions, the election of the presidents of the departmental federations by direct democracy and consulting members on election nominations. Nicolas Sarkozy wanted to change the name of the party in order to showcase the reunification of the different political views, from the social Gaullism of Henri Guaino to the right line of Patrick Buisson, into "one family". As declared in an interview for the Journal du Dimanche, Sarkozy also wished to change the name in order to be ahead of his adversaries Alain Juppé and François Fillon (also belonging to the UMP) for the 2017 presidential elections. This desire for changing the name was not received well by all members of the party. In an interview for BFMTV, Alain Juppé mocked the ex-French President for wanting to change the name of the UMP. Additionally, Gilles Boyer, supporter of Francois Fillon, showed his reluctance regarding the change of name by tweeting, "We are republicans. We are not THE republicans." This change of name was perceived by some journalists as an attempt to make the public forget the judicial problems linked to the UMP, especially the Bygmalion case, case in which some members of the UMP are suspected to have forged documents over the expenses of Nicolas Sarkozy's 2012 presidential campaign.

Critics of the name change claimed it was unfair for Sarkozy to name the party "Republicans", because every French person is a republican if they support the values and ideals of the French Republic that emanated from the French Revolution, and as such the term is above party politics. Left-wing associations and parties and 140 individuals, including 5 having "Républicain" as their last name, sued the UMP. The court was in favour of the UMP's change in name, stating that the "manifestly unlawful disturbance" and the "imminent damage" alleged by the complainants have not been demonstrated. The new name was adopted by the party bureau on 5 May 2015 and approved by the party membership on 28 May by an online "yes" vote of 83.3% on a 45.7% turnout after a court ruling in favour of Sarkozy.

Founding congress 
The change to the name "The Republicans" was confirmed at the party's founding congress on 30 May 2015 at the Paris Event Centre in Paris, attended by 10,000 activists. Angela Merkel, chairwoman of the Christian Democratic Union of Germany, sent a congratulatory message to the congress. The Republicans thus became the legal successor of the UMP and the leading centre-right party in France.

The organisation has been declared in the préfecture de Saône-et-Loire on 9 April 2015. According to the statement of this declaration, its aim is to "promote ideas of the right and centre, open to every people who wish to be member and debate in the spirit of a political party with republican ideas in France or outside France". This party foundation was published in the Journal officiel de la République française on 25 April 2015.

2016 to 2018 

On 3 July 2016, Nicolas Sarkozy announced that he would resign as leader that year in order to compete to be the centre-right candidate in the 2017 presidential election.

In order to decide which candidate will represent The Republicans for the 2017 presidential elections, a party's primary was organised in November 2016. The activists of the movement could choose between 7 candidates: François Fillion, Alain Juppé, Nicolas Sarkozy, Jean-François Copé, Nathalie Kosciusko-Morizet, Bruno Le Maire and Jean-Frédéric Poisson. François Fillon, with 44,1% of the votes, and Alain Juppé, with 28,6%, were the two candidates qualified for the second round of the election. François Fillon won the second turn of the election with 66,5% of the votes and was therefore appointed as The Republicans' candidate for the presidential election in 2017.

François Fillon suffered a historic defeat in the first round of the presidential election, as he was the first centre-right candidate in the history of the Fifth Republic who failed to continue to the second round. This led to the victory of Emmanuel Macron, leader of his newly created party La République En Marche!. François Fillon finished third in the first round of the presidential election with 20,01% of the vote, behind Emmanuel Macron (24,01%) and Marine le Pen (21,30%). This defeat is mainly due to the Penelopegate scandal, as François Fillon was considered the favourite candidate by the polls before these revelations.

The election victory of Emmanuel Macron in 2017 altered the French political landscape. After Emmanuel Macron was elected as president, he appointed three centre-right politicians in his government from The Republicans, namely Édouard Philippe as Prime Minister, Bruno Le Maire as French Minister of the Economy and Finance, and Gérald Darmanin as Minister of Public Action and Accounts. The fact that three ex-members from The Republicans are now part of the government, has allegedly divided the political party based on views of whether or not the republicans should support the incumbent government. Some members of The Republicans, such as Thierry Solère or Sébastien Lecornu, therefore decided to leave the party in order to join La République En Marche!, the new political party created by Emmanuel Macron. Other members, like Franck Riester or Fabienne Keller, decided to create a new political party: "Agir". Additionally, a parliamentary group including LR dissidents supportive of the government line, "The Constructives", was formed in the National Assembly, separate from the existing group.

A month after the Presidential elections, the legislative elections took place in France. In the second round of the legislative elections in June, The Republicans won 112 seats in parliament, which is 82 less than the number of seats won by the UMP in 2012. This result was the worst performance of a major centre-right political party in French history.

On 11 July, the political bureau of The Republicans agreed to hold a leadership election for president of the party on 10 and 17 December; Laurent Wauquiez was elected in a single round on the 10th of December, winning 74.64% of the votes. Laurent Wauquiez's election for the head of the Party continued to divide The Republicans as 26 elected officials left the party between his election on the 10th of December and the 21st of February 2018.

Since 2019 
On 2 June 2019, a week after overseeing the worst result for the centre-right in its history in the European elections with 8.48% of the vote, Wauquiez announced his resignation as president of The Republicans. On 13 October 2019, Christian Jacob, former Minister of the French Civil Service, was elected as President of the party, taking from interim President Jean Leonetti.

In the 2020 French Senate election, the Republicans held their majority. In 2021 French regional elections, the party managed to retain all regional presidencies.

In December 2021, Valérie Pécresse won the Republican congress, winning the centre-right to be the Republican candidate in the 2022 French presidential election. She earned 4.8% of the 1st round vote, which was under the 5% reimbursement threshold. Consequently, the party's funding was left in a critical condition and Pécresse launched an appeal, having been in €5 million in party debt. In the 2022 French legislative election, the Republicans lost 56 seats and fell from 2nd to 4th place in terms of seats.

In the 2022 leadership election, Eric Ciotti was elected with 53.7% of the votes against his main opponent, Bruno Retailleau, who received 46.3% to become the next leader of the party. He ruled out a formal alliance with Macron's minority government in parliament, although he was open to negotiate a pension reform. Ciotti has largely been described as right-wing and of belonging in the populist faction of the party.

Ideology

On the political spectrum, the Republicans are positioned on the centre-right, although the party has some right-wing factions. They are a conservative party, and they have been also described as liberal-conservative due to their liberal stances. Besides this, they also maintain a Gaullist tradition including Christian democracy.

Overseas territories 

In Guadeloupe, the Head of List of The Republicans is Sonia Petro. She has also served as the President of the Federation of Republicans of Guadeloupe.

Leadership

President

Vice president

Secretary-general

Treasurer

Election results

Presidential

National Assembly

European Parliament

See also

 Politics of France
 List of political parties in France
 The Republicans group (National Assembly)
 The Republicans group (Senate)

References

External links
Official web site of Les Républicains

 
2015 establishments in France
International Democrat Union member parties
Member parties of the European People's Party
Liberal conservative parties
Conservative parties in France
Centre-right parties in Europe
Gaullist parties
Political parties established in 2015
Political parties in France
Political parties of the French Fifth Republic